Chodri (Chowdhary) is a Bhil language of Gujarat and neighboring states.

References

Hindi languages
Bhil